Hider in the House is a British children's game show presented by Jason King and Joel Ross (aka JK and Joel). In the programme, a celebrity has to be hidden in a family's house by three children and a parent. If the family has fewer than three children, they use friends or related children to make up the numbers. The other parent of the family thinks they are taking part in a totally different programme. The children involved must undergo a series of tasks to win prizes which they will receive if the unaware parent does not work out what is really happening. The tasks are sometimes very messy or involve getting the unaware parent to do strange things.

The format, which was devised by Eyeworks UK, won the Best Entertainment prize at the 2008 Rose d'Or ceremony.

Series history
In late 2006, CBBC put an advert on their website for families wishing to take part in a new Saturday morning gameshow, advertised as Our House. This was in fact the cover show for Hider in the House. The first series was shown on Saturdays between 9am and 10am on BBC Two and the CBBC Channel. The first episode was shown on 17 February 2007 and the first series finished on 30 June 2007. The second series was shown from 6 January 2008 to 1 June 2008. It was changed from Saturday to Sunday because of Basil's Swap Shop.

For Series 2, the show went through a reformatting, with JK and Joel being joined by presenter, Kate Edmondson, as JK and Joel had to go undercover because too many people knew about Hider in the House. Kate is the supposed presenter of a new cover show Big Kidz. Two challenges were cut from the show and the final challenge (Hider in the House) was also changed slightly. Instead of just the unsuspecting parent trying to find the real celebrity, it was changed so the children have to find mini cut outs of the celebrity and the unsuspecting parent the real one with clues from JK and Joel. Also, the celebrity has to Push the Pedal and gunge the unsuspecting parent, otherwise the children don't get the prizes they have won. During the Chico episode, Push the Pedal backfired, and all the gunge landed on Chico's leg. However, JK had a bucket of gunge ready and poured it over the parent. The unsuspecting parent also received a large cardboard certificate, as well as being "hidered".

For Series 2, JK must go undercover for the fourth challenge to get the unsuspecting parent out of the way so the kids and the hider can get out of the house. JK sometimes cheekily drops hints of Hider in the House (e.g. while pretending to be a gardener, he said the name of a fake plant which involved the word "hider" (hiderdendrum) and while pretending to be from the army he said his last name was "hider"). The parent rarely notices these hints.

David Grant
In the sixth episode of the second series, David Grant was busted early when an unfortunate incident led to him being discovered on the first day. In view of the unusual circumstances, and because JK felt partially responsible, the three presenters discussed what to do. They offered the children the opportunity to continue playing, but on the condition that if they lost the challenges, they would lose all the prizes they had already won. Unsuspecting friends and family were substituted for the unsuspecting parent.

Episode list

Series 1

Series 2

 Week 21: Hider in the House Awards
 Week 22: Best Bits of Hider in the House (Part 1)
 Week 23: Best Bits of Hider in the House (Part 2)

Forfeits
If the Hider failed a challenge, they were given a forfeit for the children to win back the prizes. In Series One, it was 'Suck the Sock' where the hider had to suck a sock full of smoothie to win the prizes back.  Sometimes the sock was changed to another thing associated with the celebrity. For example, for Steph Orleans and Malak it became 'Lick the sock'. In Series Two, the forfeit was sometimes Lick the Taches, where they had to lick a horrible substance moustache off their face. An example of this is Lil' Chris in Week 3 when he had to lick a moustache of tartar sauce off his face. In certain episodes, it was still 'Suck the Sock'. However, there was only one forfeit per episode and that was taken on the first failed challenge.It wasn't always a smoothie that was to be sucked – sometimes it was gravy but modified or crushed lollipops with orange juice and ginger. For Dani Harmer in Week 1 it was 'Suck Nan's Tights'.

Awards
The series won the Best Entertainment prize at the prestigious 2008 Rose d'Or ceremony.

References

External links
Hider in the House – Web Archive

BBC children's television shows
BBC television game shows
British children's game shows
2000s British game shows
2007 British television series debuts
2008 British television series endings